Sir Thomas Deane (Cork, 1792 – Dublin, 1871) was an Irish architect. He was the father of Sir Thomas Newenham Deane, and grandfather of Sir Thomas Manly Deane, who were also architects.

Life
Thomas Deane was born in Cork, the eldest son of Alexander Deane, a builder, and Elizabeth Sharpe. His grandparents and uncle were also builders and architects, and had married into families of the same professions, the Kearns and Hargraves.

His father died in 1806, leaving his mother with seven children to bring up. There was a flaw in his will, which prevented Mrs. Deane from acquiring the properties that he owned in Cork city, and a private Act of Parliament was required to enable her to gain the leases of the properties. Mrs. Deane continued the family business, and Thomas started work there at fourteen years of age. In 1811 he designed his first building, the Cork Commercial Buildings, on South Mall, won in competition against William Wilkins (1778–1839).

Deane was to the forefront of the development of the arts and sciences in his native city. He served on Cork Corporation for many years. He was Mayor of Cork in 1815, 1830 and 1851, and was knighted in 1830. He was a staunch Tory, but ended up supporting a Catholic, Daniel Callaghan, in 1830. Later in life he grew tired of the political in-fighting.

In 1820 he bought the Ummera Estate in County Cork, and later bought and renovated a Georgian house at Dundanion close to Blackrock.

He designed a number of buildings in the city of Cork, including parts of the University College campus, and St Mary's Cathedral, Tuam (completed after his death, in 1878).

In 1860 he moved to Dublin, buying a house in Longford Terrace in Monkstown.  He was elected President of the Royal Hibernian Academy in 1866.

He had two children by his first marriage: Julia and John Connellan Deane. Julia died in 1863. John was educated at Midleton College, Cork, and matriculated in 1831 at Trinity College, Dublin, at the age of sixteen.  He had to be rescued from debt a number of occasions during his youth. He trained for the bar at the King's Inn in Dublin and Gray's Inn in London. During the Famine he was a Poor Law inspector in Donegal and Galway. He came up with the idea of the Art Treasures Exhibition in Manchester in 1857.</ref> He died at Posillipo, Naples, on 24 February 1887 and was buried in the English Cemetery, Naples.

By his second marriage, to Eliza, Thomas had three children: Thomas Newenham, born 15 June 1828, Susanna Adelaide (Ada), born 1837, and Olivia Louise, born 1838.

References

Notes

Sources

 
 
 
 

1792 births
1871 deaths
Irish architects
People from Cork (city)